Kevin John Foster  (born 31 December 1978) is a British Conservative Party politician who has been the Member of Parliament for Torbay since 2015. He served as Minister of State for Transport from September 2022 until October 2022. Foster served under Home Secretary Priti Patel as Parliamentary Under-Secretary of State for Safe and Legal Migration from 2019 until September 2022.

Early life and career
Kevin Foster was born in Plymouth, Devon on 31 December 1978 to Michael and Linda Foster. His early education was at the community school Hele's School. Foster studied law at the University of Warwick (LLB, 2000; LLM, 2001). After graduating from university, he worked in the West Midlands as a paralegal and secretary for a number of firms.

Foster stood successfully as the Conservative candidate in the Cheylesmore ward of Coventry City Council in 2002. He was re-elected in 2004, 2007 and 2011. He served as Leader of the opposition for two years in Coventry, before standing down in 2013 to contest the 2015 general election in Torbay.

Parliamentary career
Foster contested Coventry South in 2010 general election, coming second to incumbent Labour Party MP Jim Cunningham.

Foster was elected at the 2015 general election as the Member of Parliament (MP) for Torbay in 2015. His election agent Alison Hernandez was investigated by the Independent Police Complaints Commission over allegations she failed to properly declare election expenses that were submitted in her role. This investigation was later dropped in 2017 by the Crown Prosecution Service as although "the returns may have been inaccurate, there is insufficient evidence to prove to the criminal standard that any candidate or agent was dishonest".

Foster supported the United Kingdom (UK) remaining within the European Union (EU) prior to the 2016 membership referendum, but since then has almost always voted against UK membership of the EU in Parliament.

In the June 2017 general election, he held his seat with a majority of 14,283 (27.9%). Foster voted for then Prime Minister Theresa May's Brexit withdrawal agreement in early 2019. He was appointed as Parliamentary Private Secretary (PPS) in the Department for Communities and Local Government. He later became PPS to then Minister for the Cabinet Office David Lidington.

In July 2019, following Boris Johnson becoming prime minister, Foster served as Parliamentary Private Secretary to the Cabinet Office, Parliamentary Under-Secretary of State in the Wales Office, and an assistant government whip.

In December 2019, Foster was appointed as the Parliamentary-Under Secretary of State for Immigration, succeeding Seema Kennedy. His portfolio was changed to Immigration and Future Borders in the 2020 cabinet reshuffle, and was changed again to Safe and Legal Migration in December 2021.

In February 2022, Foster received widespread criticism for stating on Twitter that Ukrainian refugees could use the seasonal worker scheme in order to get into the UK. Scottish First Minister, Nicola Sturgeon, and Shadow Foreign Secretary, David Lammy, were among the critics, with the latter saying that Foster's comments showed 'a shameful moral vacuum at the heart of Government'. Foster deleted the tweet within hours.

Foster endorsed Liz Truss in the July-September 2022 Conservative Party leadership election. Following Truss's election as Prime Minister, Foster was appointed as Minister of State for Transport with responsibility for rail. He left the government following Rishi Sunak's appointment as Prime Minister and returned to the backbenches.

Personal life
Kevin Foster married Hazel Noonan (b. 1951) in 2017. They met in Coventry when he was a University of Warwick student. He was helping her to canvass for the Conservative Party in the local council elections in which she was a candidate. The 27-year age gap between Foster and Noonan has drawn comparisons to Emmanuel Macron, the President of France, who is also substantially younger than his partner.

Notes

References

External links

1978 births
Living people
Alumni of the University of Warwick
Conservative Party (UK) MPs for English constituencies
UK MPs 2015–2017
Politicians from Plymouth, Devon
Members of the Inner Temple
UK MPs 2017–2019
UK MPs 2019–present